Wahpeton may refer to:

Places
Wahpeton, Iowa, U.S.
Wahpeton, North Dakota, U.S.
Wahpeton micropolitan area

Other uses
List of ships named Wahpeton

See also

Sisseton Wahpeton Oyate, a federally recognized tribe in South Dakota, U.S.
Wahpeton Dakota Nation, in Saskatchewan, Canada